Buchinaidu Kandriga mandal or B. N. Kandriga mandal is one of the 34 mandals in Tirupati district of the Indian state of Andhra Pradesh. The mandal headquarters are located at Kanamanambedu. The mandal is bounded by Varadaiahpalem, K.V.B. Puram, Thottambedu mandals.

Demographics 

 census, the mandal had a population of 34,261. The total population constitute, 17,097 males and 17,164 females —a sex ratio of 1004 females per 1000 males. 4,170 children are in the age group of 0–6 years, of which 2,129 are boys and 2,041 are girls. The average literacy rate stands at 65.39% with 19,677 literates.

Administration 
The mandal was a part of Chittoor district and was made a part of the newly formed Tirupati district on 4 April 2022. It is a part of Sullurupeta revenue division.

Towns and villages 

 census, the mandal has 24 villages.

The settlements in the mandal are listed below:

† – Mandal Headquarters

See also 
 List of mandals in Andhra Pradesh

References

Mandals in Tirupati district
Tirupati district